The Fletcher Street Riding Club is a 501(c)(3) non-profit organization devoted to inner-city horsemanship in north Philadelphia.

Part of a century-long tradition of black cowboys and horsemanship in Philadelphia, local horsemen maintain and care for horses and teach neighborhood youth to do so. They encourage academic excellence and provide positive ways for local youth to spend their leisure time outdoors.

The horses used in the program were initially purchased at a livestock auction in New Holland, Pennsylvania, giving a second chance to animals that would likely otherwise have been killed.

The Fletcher Street club stables are in the Strawberry Mansion neighborhood of north Philadelphia, on the edge of Fairmount Park. Informal stables exist throughout North and West Philadelphia and in Cobbs Creek Park, on private and abandoned city land.  The horses are ridden throughout the city's streets and parks, and regular races are held on an open strip of Fairmount Park called the Speedway. Experienced horsemen and youth in the area care for the horses, and the Fletcher Street club horses receive additional care from a prominent area veterinarian. In 2017, it changed its location to  

The nonprofit organization has struggled to find funding and secure and maintain their place of operations. In April 2021, following the release of the Netflix movie based on them, Ellis Ferrell and the Fletcher Street Riding Club launched a fundraiser, so that support could flow into the real-life programs that Ferrell, his family, and the group's friends have largely self-funded for decades, despite external pressure, direct city government interference, and acquisition of their longtime property for housing construction.

The experienced horsemen often ride these horses past the recreational field on 15th street known as 'The Oval'. It is here that the horses catch the attention of many Temple University Diamond Band members.

History
The club has been around for over 100 years, but the current organization was founded in 2004 by Ellis Ferrell. In the late 2000s, the city government razed some of the stables and the club house, ostensibly to redevelop the land. At the time, the Society for the Prevention of Cruelty to Animals publicly investigated allegations by city officials that the horses were being mistreated. The allegations proved baseless. However, with the land razed and redevelopment progressing, many horses had to be moved. In the subsequent decade, a few dozen horses remained.

In 2009, the club planned to bring more formal mentoring and tutoring elements into its programs, although tight budgets made this difficult. On Halloween of that year, the program held a benefit event at the First District Plaza in Philadelphia, a collaboration between local fishermen (who also run a youth program), local churches, the urban cowboys themselves, and the local business association, Strawberry Mansion SMART Business Association.

For decades, the club has been led by Ellis Ferrill and supported by other local horsemen and community members. In previous years, the Fletcher Street Urban Riding Club was a registered nonprofit in Pennsylvania and Friends of Fletcher Street, a supporting organization, was under the fiscal sponsorship of MAP Holistic Community Development, a nonprofit 501(c)(3) organization.

Since 2015, the Club has been a recognized federal nonprofit organization with 501(c)(3) tax-exempt status, enabling it to accept tax-deductible donations, including its first title deed to a 7,500-square-foot piece of vacant land, and revive its fundraising efforts.
 The lot was donated to the organization by Good Bet Trading, a local real estate company owned by Philadelphia native Adam Ehrlich.

In 2019 the club moved onto newly acquired land. However, the long-dormant triangle of city land used for decades by the club is now threatened by the Philadelphia Housing Authority, which acquired the land for $1 and has broken ground on a housing project.

In popular culture

The Fletcher Street Urban Riding Club has been mentioned in NPR's This American Life (television version) and in regional equestrian magazines.  It has also attracted photographers and filmmakers, local and global, amateur and professional.  Martha Camarillo published a book of photographs, "Fletcher Street."

City residents, surprised to see horses passing through the city, regularly snap and post images on personal webpages.

G. Neri's 2011 young adult novel Ghetto Cowboy is based in Fletcher Street and urban horsemanship culture.

The novel was adapted into a film called Concrete Cowboy starring Idris Elba that debuted on Netflix on April 2, 2021.

The music video for the song "Feel the Love" by Rudimental featured the Fletcher Street horses, men, and boys. which has been viewed more than 106 million times.

In the second issue of the "Wasteland" storyline of the Bureau for Paranormal Research and Defense (part of the Hellboy comic universe), the character Nichols Nichols, who grew up in Philadelphia, is surprisingly knowledgeable about horses. When asked how, he identifies the Fletcher Street Urban Riding Club, remarking, "City didn't care what happened to little brothers, but Fletcher Street, they looked out for us."

In early 2018, Google featured the club in a video advertising its Pixel 2 smartphone.

Other urban horsemanship programs

In Philadelphia, one organized group is the Black Cowboys Association, which Philadelphia Weekly called "a Philadelphia institution that offers kids in the city's toughest neighborhoods the chance to claim a path out of the 'hood on horseback."  Another formal horsemanship program in Philadelphia for local teenagers is Work to Ride, based at Chamounix Equestrian Stables in Fairmount Park.

Black urban horsemanship programs exist in major cities throughout the United States.  These include Horses in the Hood in Los Angeles and the Federation of Black Cowboys in Queens in New York City, the subject of a 2003 film produced by Zachary Mortensen.

Internationally, the best-known related program is based in Dublin, Ireland. These urban cowboys, known as Pony Kids, have access to 3,000 horses (as of 1996).  The horses attract and engage youth in a difficult low-income neighborhood. They face many of the same challenges as their American counterparts.  British newspaper The Independent described "Dublin's suburban horse culture" as "a fascinating example of what happens when the poor appropriate the pleasures of the rich." An anthropological study of the Dublin program examined the community development program in the context of anti-poverty efforts.  A television series documented the story of five pony kids selected to ride and tour the fancier equine world.

See also
 Compton Cowboys

References
 Lisa Thomas, "Island of Hope: Fletcher Street Urban Riding Club," December 3, 2015. https://web.archive.org/web/20151206233606/http://www.horsecollaborative.com/fletcher-street-urban-riding-club-island-of-hope/
 Kristen Kovatch, "Friday Standing Ovation: The Fletcher Street Urban Riding Club," June 20, 2014. http://www.horsenation.com/2014/06/20/friday-standing-ovation-the-fletcher-street-urban-riding-club
 Dana DiFilippo, "Enough horsing around?", The Philadelphia Daily News, September 15, 2008. http://www.philly.com/dailynews/local/20080915_Enough_horsing_around_.html
 Steve Volk, "Who Killed Mecca Harris?", Philadelphia Weekly, December 14, 2005. https://web.archive.org/web/20120305141841/http://www.philadelphiaweekly.com/news-and-opinion/cover-story/who_killed_mecca_harris-38403464.html
 Sanjiv Bhattacharya, "Red riding hood", Telegraph. 17 Feb 2007. https://www.telegraph.co.uk/culture/3663231/Red-riding-hood.html
 "Street Riders" and "Hoofbeats on Fletcher Street" LIFE Magazine (Cover), April 22, 2005. http://www.life.com/image/52735208 (cover), full scanned copy at https://web.archive.org/web/20100827085718/http://johnnydwyer.net/clips/pdf/hoofbeats.pdf
 Fletcher Street Urban Riding Club website, created by photographer and supporter Martha Camarillo, accessed December 15, 2009. http://www.fletcherstreeturbanridingclub.com/main.html

External links
Official Website
Facebook page for the club set up by supporters

Equestrian organizations
Non-profit organizations based in Philadelphia
Sports in Philadelphia
African-American equestrians